Lagerheimia is a genus of green algae in the family Oocystaceae.

The genus name of Lagerheimia is in honour of Nils Gustaf Lagerheim (1860–1926), who was a Swedish botanist, mycologist, phycologist, and pteridologist.

The genus was circumscribed by Giovanni Battista De Toni and Robert Hippolyte Chodat in Nuova Notarisia vol.6 on page 86-90 in 1895.

References

External links

Trebouxiophyceae genera
Trebouxiophyceae
Oocystaceae